Suture and Other Songs is a compilation CD of the Suture LP and Signal 7" by the band Four Hundred Years.

Track listing 
"Intro" – 0:37
"Life Support" – 1:35
"Suture" – 2:04
"Steve's Song" – 3:32
"Level Playing Field" – 1:52
"Nickel and Dime" – 1:41
"Thicker Than Water" – 2:45
"Architect" – 2:04
"Love Letter to the CIA" – 1:59
"Six Minutes" – 3:33
"Signal" – 1:54
"Red Tape" – 1:41
"Lock Up" – 1:56
"Hoodwinked" – 3:14

Four Hundred Years albums
1999 albums